Stanley Maddox Rumbough Jr. (April 25, 1920 – September 27, 2017) was an American businessman, entrepreneur, distinguished veteran, philanthropist, activist, longtime civic leader, and a member of Colgate-Palmolive. As a businessman and investor, he was a founder, chief executive officer or director of more than 40 companies in the United States, West Indies, and Mexico.

Life and career
Rumbough was born in Manhattan, New York City on April 25, 1920 and attended Yale University, where he was an editor of campus humor magazine The Yale Record. His parents were Lieutenant Colonel Stanley Maddox Rumbough Sr. (1886–1961) and Elizabeth Morse Colgate (1889–1962), daughter of Gilbert Colgate, granddaughter of Samuel Colgate and great-granddaughter of William Colgate, founder of Colgate-Palmolive. He had one sister, Elizabeth Colgate Rumbough.

During World War II, he served in the United States Marine Corps as a decorated fighter pilot in the Pacific Theater, and flew more than 50 combat missions, receiving two awards of the Distinguished Flying Cross and eight Air Medals.

For many years, he worked for a variety of manufacturing companies.

Rumbough also had an interest in Republican politics. In 1951, he was co-founder (with Charles F. Willis) of the Citizens for Eisenhower movement, which helped develop grassroots support for the presidential campaign of Dwight D. Eisenhower.

Branches of Citizens for Eisenhower were established in each state and helped plan local campaign activities. At the height of the 1952 campaign the national headquarters of Citizens for Eisenhower in New York City had over 700 volunteers and an extensive administrative staff.

After Eisenhower became president, Rumbough became a special assistant in the White House where he helped organize the Executive Branch Liaison Office. This office compiled newsletters, known as Fact Papers, analyzing statements by the president and cabinet officers on a variety of issues, and explaining major administration programs and accomplishments. The newsletters were circulated to members of the administration who had been appointed by the president, which enabled political appointees to follow the evolution of administration policy. The office staff also helped coordinate public speeches made by administration officials to ensure that the officials would appear in venues that would be most beneficial to the administration.

Stanley Rumbough died on September 27, 2017 at the age of 97, only four months after his first wife Dina Merrill.

Personal life
He was married first to heiress, socialite and actress Dina Merrill from 1946 to 1966; the couple had three children: Stanley Hutton Rumbough, David Post Rumbough (1950–1973) and Nedenia Colgate Rumbough. He is survived by his second wife, Margaretha Wagstrom Rumbough, and his third wife Janne Herlow Rumbough, a champion dressage rider.

References

External links
 Papers of Stanley M. Rumbough Jr., Dwight D. Eisenhower Presidential Library 
 White House Executive Branch Liaison Office, Dwight D. Eisenhower Presidential Library 
 

1920 births
2017 deaths
Eisenhower administration personnel
New York (state) Republicans
American socialites
United States Marine Corps pilots of World War II
Military personnel from New York City
Recipients of the Distinguished Flying Cross (United States)
American World War II fighter pilots
Recipients of the Air Medal